Pierre Romain Owono Ebéde (born 9 February 1980) is a Cameroonian former professional footballer who played as a goalkeeper. He made one appearance for the Cameroon national team.

Club career 
Ebéde went to Greece during the 1998 summer transfer window to play for Apollon Kalamarias. He stayed there until January 2002, when Chalkidona (a now non-existent team that was later merged with Atromitos) bought him for €46,500.

His good performances led Greek Superleague club Panathinaikos to acquire him in 2005. Known for his very good reflexes, he quickly became a favorite among the team's fans.

During his first season with the Greens, Ebede saw all 30 Alpha Ethniki games from the bench, behind starting goalkeeper Croatian Mario Galinovic. His second season was much better, being in the starting line up of Panathinaikos in 22 games.

However, Ebéde was dismissed from Panathinaikos on 31 May 2007 and later joined Metz. After his spell in France, he signed a contract with AEL Limassol on 4 June 2008.

In July 2020, it was reported Ebéde would remain with Haguenau.

Notes

References

External links
 
 

Living people
1980 births
Cameroonian footballers
Association football goalkeepers
Cameroon international footballers
2006 Africa Cup of Nations players
Tonnerre Yaoundé players
Apollon Pontou FC players
Chalkidona F.C. players
Panathinaikos F.C. players
FC Metz players
AEL Limassol players
FC Astra Giurgiu players
FCSR Haguenau players
Ligue 1 players
Super League Greece players
Liga I players
Cypriot First Division players
Division d'Honneur players
Championnat National 3 players
Championnat National 2 players
Cameroonian expatriate footballers
Cameroonian expatriate sportspeople in Greece
Expatriate footballers in Greece
Cameroonian expatriate sportspeople in France
Expatriate footballers in France
Cameroonian expatriate sportspeople in Cyprus
Expatriate footballers in Cyprus
Cameroonian expatriate sportspeople in Romania
Expatriate footballers in Romania